Acantholimon acanthobryum is a species of flowering plant in the Plumbaginaceae family. The species is epidemic to Ghazni, Afghanistan and was discovered by Rech.f. & Schiman-Czeika.

See also 
List of Acantholimon species

References 

Flora of Afghanistan
acanthobryum
Plants described in 1974
Taxa named by Karl Heinz Rechinger